Barrocas is a city in the Brazilian state of Bahia. It was founded in 2000.

References

Municipalities in Bahia